Yoon Sang-jeong (born 1998) is a South Korean actress.

Filmography

Film

Television series

Web series

Awards and nominations

References

External links
 
 

Living people
South Korean television actresses
21st-century South Korean actresses
1998 births